Kim Yong-ho (born 2 September 1964) is a North Korean former footballer. He represented North Korea on at least seventeen occasions between 1992 and 1993.

Career statistics

International

References

1964 births
Living people
North Korean footballers
North Korea international footballers
Association football goalkeepers
1992 AFC Asian Cup players